Alan Sanderson is a recording engineer, mixer, music producer, studio owner based in Southern California.

Sanderson is credited with working on some of the most successful albums of the 1990-2000s while working as an engineer at Cello and Ocean Way Studios in Hollywood, California. Some of the artists Sanderson has recorded include:  Fleetwood Mac, Michael Jackson, Elton John, Fiona Apple, B.B. King, Counting Crows, Elvis Costello, Ziggy Marley, Ryan Adams and Weezer. In 1997 he was an engineer on The Rolling Stones album Bridges to Babylon.

On February 13, 2011 Sanderson earned a Grammy for his participation in the recording of the album Hello Hurricane by the musical group Switchfoot.

Since 2014, Sanderson has owned and operated Pacific Beat Recording Studio in La Jolla, CA.

Partial discography

Albums
 THe Rolling Stones'- Bridges to Babylon
 The Rolling Stones - Studio Albums Vinyl Collection 1971-2016
 Living Colour - The Chair In The Doorway
 Elvis Costello & Burt Bacharach - Painted from Memory
 Elvis Costello & No Doubt - I Throw My Toys Around
 Counting Crows - Hard Candy
 Donovan - Sutras
 Fleetwood Mac - Say You Will
 Fleetwood Mac - Time
 Rita Coolidge - And So In Love
 Tonex - Out Of The Box
 Jewel - 0304
 Fiona Apple - Tidal
 Michael Jackson - History
 Elton John - Songs From The West Coast
 BB King - Let The Good Times Roll
 Ziggy Marley - Spirit of Music
 The Rolling Stones - Bridges to Babylon Ryan Adams - Demolition Rusted Root - Welcome to The Party Madonna - Ray Of Light Burt Bacharach & Don Was - 2000 Academy Awards The Doors - Perception Elliott Smith - XO Rod Stewart - When We Were The New Boys Rod Stewart - The Great American Song Book Tristeza - A Colores Tribal Seeds - Tribal Seeds (Self Titled) Tribal Seeds - The Harvest Weezer - Weezer Paul Westerberg - Suicaine Gratification Christopher Sluka - Ready To Connect, Figure It Out''

References

External links
Alan Sanderson Interview - NAMM Oral History Library (2016)

1970 births
Living people